The US Family Health Plan (USFHP)  is a U.S. Department of Defense-sponsored healthcare plan that serves military family members exclusively. US Family Health Plan operates in six regions, sixteen states, including the District of Columbia.

Services 
USFHP  delivers full TRICARE Prime  benefits to more than 150,000 beneficiaries, including the family members of active-duty military, activated Guard and Reserve, and military retirees and their family members. In 2013,US Family Health Plan achieved an overall patient satisfaction rating of 92.5 percent—far surpassing industry standards for nineteen consecutive years.

Coverage 
The US Family Health Plan provides a full continuum of care, from preventive and wellness programs to more intensive disease and case management initiatives for members with chronic or multiple conditions. It currently offers more than 40 disease and case management programs across all of its sites.

Enrollment in the US Family Health Plan is offered through the following community-based hospital and physician networks, known as Designated Providers:
Johns Hopkins Medicine (1-800-801-9322) – serving Maryland, Washington D.C., and parts of Pennsylvania, Virginia, Delaware and West Virginia
Martin's Point Health Care (1-888-241-4556) – serving Maine, New Hampshire, Vermont, upstate and western New York, and the northern tier of Pennsylvania
Brighton Marine Health Center (1-800-818-8589) – serving Massachusetts, including Cape Cod; Rhode Island; and northern Connecticut
Saint Vincent Catholic Medical Centers (1-800-241-4848) – serving New York City, Long Island, southern Connecticut, New Jersey, Philadelphia and area suburbs
CHRISTUS Health (1-800-678-7347) – serving southeast Texas and southwest Louisiana
Pacific Medical Centers  (1-888-958-7347) – serving the Puget Sound area of Washington State.

History 
The Designated Providers of the US Family Health Plan have been delivering healthcare to military beneficiaries for over 30 years. In 1981, Congress enacted the Omnibus Reconciliation Act  designating certain former U.S. Public Health Service facilities as Uniformed Services Treatment Facilities (USTFs). The following year, the Department of Defense assumed responsibility for the USTF program from the Department of Health and Human Services. In 1993, the USTFs developed a managed care plan, called the Uniformed Services Family Health Plan, and in 1996, became “TRICARE Designated Providers”—the first DoD-sponsored, full-risk managed health care plan and the first to serve the military 65 and older population (other than on a limited demonstration basis). The Plan began offering the TRICARE Prime benefit the following year. In 2001, the name was shortened to US Family Health Plan.

Awards 
Having long served military families, the US Family Health Plan in 2008 was awarded an Emmy Award from the National Academy of Television Arts & Sciences for a 2007 public service announcement series, "Now is Our Time to Serve". This joint public service initiative  with the non-profit National Military Family Association (NMFA) urged viewers to "support, befriend, remember and appreciate" America's military family members.

References 

http://www.tricare.mil/pressroom/contractornews.aspx?fid=121
http://www.emmyonline.tv/mediacenter/public_0708_winners.html
http://www.armytimes.com/news/2008/11/military_emmy_militaryfamilies_112108w/
http://www.usminstitute.org/newsletters/2008-10-10.html
http://www.riverdalepress.com/full.php?sid=5264&current_edition=2008-07-17

External links 
http://www.usfamilyhealthplan.org
http://www.yearofthemilitaryfamily.org/

Military medicine in the United States
United States Department of Defense